Djibril Kouyaté (Arabic: جبريل كوياتي born 1942), is a Malian filmmaker and actor. He is best known as the director of critically acclaimed feature films such as The return of Tieman, Tiefing and Walaha.

Personal life
He was born in 1942 in Bamako, Mali.

Career
In 1969, he made the maiden directorial debut with l'artisanat. Then he made the film Le retour de Tieman (1970), Le drapeau noir au sud du berceau (1976) and Le Mali aujourd'hui (1978). As an actor, he acted in the films: Verloren Maandag (1974), Ta Dona (1991), and Macadam tribu (1999). In 2000, he acted in the critically acclaimed film Code inconnu in which his character as 'Youssouf' was highly praised.

Filmography

References

External links
 

Living people
Malian film directors
Malian actors
1942 births
People from Bamako
21st-century Malian people